See Judah he-Hasid (disambiguation) for other people who used this name.

Judah he-Hasid Segal ha-Levi (c. 1660 in Siedlce – 19 October 1700 in Jerusalem, Ottoman Syria) was a Jewish preacher who led the largest organized group of Jewish immigrants to the Land of Israel in the 17th and 18th centuries.

Departure from Europe
Judah traveled from one Jewish community to another throughout Poland, urging repentance, asceticism, physical mortifications, and calling for aliyah.

In 1697, he and 31 families of his followers left for Moravia and made a stop at Nikolsburg. Judah spent a year traveling throughout Germany and Moravia gaining followers. Many joined the group, influenced by his fervor. By the time the whole group gathered in Italy, they numbered about 1,500.

Almost a third of the pilgrims died of hardships and illnesses during the trip. On the way, they contracted debts, and in exchange for permission to enter the Ottoman Empire they were forced to give the Turkish authorities financial guarantees in the name of Jerusalem's Jewish community.

Arrival in Jerusalem
The group arrived in Jerusalem on October 14, 1700. At that time, about 200 Ashkenazi and about 1,000 Sephardi Jews lived in the city, mostly on charities from the Jewish diaspora. The sudden influx of between 500 and 1,000 Ashkenazim  produced a crisis: the local community was unable to help such a large group. In addition, some of the newcomers were suspected to be Sabbateans, whom the local Jews viewed with hostility. The situation grew worse when Judah He-Hasid died within days of his arrival to Jerusalem. He is buried on the Mount of Olives.

Emissaries were sent to the Council of the Four Lands for aid, but it did not arrive.

Legacy

Some of the Ashkenazi Jews moved to other cities (mainly Jewish holy cities other than Jerusalem: Hebron, Tiberias, and Safed). Others started to dress like Sephardi Jews.

The synagogue, called Hurvat Yehudah He-Hasid (Destroyed Place of Judah He-Hasid), was rebuilt in 1864 by the Perushim, becoming the chief Ashkenazi synagogue in Jerusalem. The building was destroyed by the Arab Legion in 1948. It was then rebuilt and rededicated in 2010.

References

External links
The Land of Promise: The Return to Zion March 27, 2003 (Israel MFA)
Pre-Zionism (Jewish Agency for Israel)

1660s births
1700 deaths
Aliyah
Burials at the Jewish cemetery on the Mount of Olives
Forerunners of Zionism
Islam and Judaism
Jewish mysticism
People from Jerusalem
People from Siedlce
Polish emigrants to the Ottoman Empire
17th-century Polish rabbis
Polish Zionists
Ashkenazi rabbis in Ottoman Palestine